Louisville Presbyterian Theological Seminary, currently branded as Louisville Seminary, is a seminary affiliated with the Presbyterian Church (USA), located in Louisville, Kentucky. It is one of ten official PC (USA) seminaries, though it currently identifies as an ecumenical seminary, with recent student enrollment representing many faith traditions.

Though now located in Louisville, it was founded in 1853 in Danville, Kentucky (the site is now Centre College) and was known as the Danville Theological Seminary. Though it thrived in its early years, the Civil War took a great toll and by 1870 there were only six students enrolled, and as few as one professor at times, requiring classes to be taught by the faculty of Centre College.

The seminary is accredited by the Southern Association of Colleges and Schools  as well as the Association of Theological Schools. The Seminary is located on land adjacent to the Cherokee-Seneca Parks designed by Olmsted.

History
In 1893, a seminary opened in Louisville, operating out of Sunday School rooms in Second Presbyterian Church at Second and Broadway, with 31 students and six professors initially, and an endowment of $104,000. Longtime treasurer W.T. Grant died in 1901 and left his entire $300,000 estate to the seminary, which helped finance the construction of a new Gothic-style Campus. Daniel S. Bentley had studied at the Presbyterian Theological Seminary in Danville.

In 1901, the still-struggling Danville seminary merged with the Louisville one. Because of the merger, it was the lone institution supported simultaneously by the northern and southern branches of the modern Presbyterian Church (USA). Faculty and students have been drawn from both denominations. The two branches, which split during the Civil War, were reunited in 1983.

In the 1950s, Interstate 65 was planned to be constructed within a few feet of the seminary building. This led to a move in 1963 to a new campus off of Alta Vista Road, in the Cherokee-Seneca neighborhood. The old Gothic-style buildings eventually became the campus of Jefferson Community College, which is now a part of Jefferson Community and Technical College. The seminary eventually acquired the Gardencourt Mansion, and integrated it into the adjacent campus.

See also
 Presbyterianism
 Southern Baptist Theological Seminary
 Religion in Louisville, Kentucky

References

External links

 Official site

 
Educational institutions established in 1853
Educational institutions established in 1893
Presbyterian Church (USA) seminaries
Presbyterianism in Kentucky
Seminaries and theological colleges in Kentucky
Universities and colleges in Louisville, Kentucky
Universities and colleges accredited by the Southern Association of Colleges and Schools
1893 establishments in Kentucky